Alaska Packard Davidson (March 1, 1868 – July 16, 1934) was an American law enforcement officer who is best known for being the first female special agent in the FBI.

Personal life  
Davidson was born in Warren, Ohio, on March 1, 1868, to Warren and Mary Elizabeth Doud Packard. Her two brothers, James Ward Packard and William Doud Packard, founded Packard, an automobile manufacturer later taken over by Studebaker. 

Little is preserved about her personal life, except that she only had three years of public schooling and no university education and that she had one child, Esther, who died in 1902. She was married twice, first to Ephraim B. McCrum Jr. in 1893. In 1910 and 1920, the United States Census lists her husband's name as James B. Davidson. In 1930, her marital status is listed as "widowed".

She died on July 16, 1934, at the age of 66.

Work at the FBI 
On October 11, 1922, at age 54, Davidson was hired by director William J. Burns to work at the Bureau of Investigation (the former name of the FBI) as a special investigator; she was the first female special agent. Trained in New York City, she was later assigned to the Washington, D.C. field office. Her starting salary was $7 a day plus $4 when traveling. 

The Bureau was interested in hiring female agents to work on cases related to the Mann Act, which aimed to combat interstate sex trafficking. However, since she was considered "very refined", the order was given that she wasn't to be put on "rough" cases. This, combined with her limited schooling, meant that she was considered to be of limited use when it came to prosecuting such crimes. During her work at the Washington field office, she was also involved in a case against another agent who was selling classified Department of Justice information to criminals.

After J. Edgar Hoover became acting director of the Bureau in 1924 following the Teapot Dome scandal, he asked for Davidson's resignation when the Special Agent in Charge at the Washington field office reported that he had "no particular work for a woman agent". She resigned on June 10, 1924.

Only three women became agents in the 1920s and, with the resignation of Davidson and fellow agent Jessie B. Duckstein in 1924 and Lenore Houston in 1928, the FBI had no female agents between 1929 and 1972.

In popular culture 
Davidson's mention as the first female FBI agent by the character Lana Kane in the episode titled "Waxing Gibbous" of the TV series Archer: Dreamland has been noted by The A.V. Club as an example of the show's habit of using obscure references.

References

External links

1868 births
1934 deaths
People from Warren, Ohio
Federal Bureau of Investigation agents